The Political Party of Veterans of the War in Afghanistan and Participants of Other Local Military Conflicts, often shortened to the Afghans' Party, is a political party in Kyrgyzstan representing the interests of veterans of the Soviet-Afghan War and other military conflicts.

In the 2021 parliamentary election, party leader Akbokon Tashtanbekov won in single-mandate constituency №30 and became a deputy.

Election results

Jogorku Kenesh

See also 
 Party of Veterans of Afghanistan Ukrainian Afghan War Veteran's party

References

Political parties in Kyrgyzstan
Political parties established in 1994